The 33rd Sports Emmy Awards were presented on April 30, 2012 at the Frederick P. Rose Hall at the Jazz at Lincoln Center in New York City.

Awards

Programs

Personalities

Technical

References
 
 
 

 033
Sports Emmy Awards
Emmy Awards